Kevin Parsons may refer to:

 Kevin Parsons (politician) (born 1961), Canadian politician
 Kevin Parsons (cricketer) (born 1973), former English cricketer
 Kevin Parsons Sr. (1930–2013), Canadian politician